El Gato Negro, Nocturnal Warrior is an ongoing independent comic book series featuring the adventures of the superhero, El Gato Negro. Created by Richard Dominguez and published under his own Azteca Productions imprint, the series began in November 2005. It is now being compiled online at webcomicsnation.com

Premise
"Nocturnal Warrior" takes place in South Texas, where the communities of the Lower Rio Grande Valley are constantly threatened by  gangs, drug runners, and costumed criminals. In an effort to fight and prevent crime, social worker Francisco "Pancho" Guerrero adopts his grandfather's former identity as El Gato Negro, promising to "bring bad luck to all those who do evil". Unlike most superheroes, El Gato Negro possesses no superpowers and instead makes use of his own athletic abilities, accumulative knowledge, detective skills to fight crime. He is assisted in his war on crime by several supporting characters including his grandfather, Agustin Guerrero. In the eyes of the general public, El Gato Negro is known as a living legend and watchful protector of South Texas but despite his best efforts is constantly hunted by the local law enforcement agencies and demonized by the media as a public menace.

See also
El Gato Negro

References

External links
Official site
Webcomics Nation
Dominguez Illustrations

2005 comics debuts
Comics characters introduced in 2005
Publications established in 2005
Professional wrestling comics